James Edward Moore Jr. (April 27, 1951 – August 14, 2022) was an American Black Catholic composer, singer and music pedagogue from LaCrosse, Virginia. His 1983 composition, the Communion hymn and psalm "Taste and See", is frequently sung in churches worldwide.

Career 
Moore was professor of music and liturgy at the seminary Athenaeum of Ohio between 1977 and 1982, and music director of the Chor der Alten Burse in Vienna, Austria, from 1984 to 1987.

Since 1984, he lived in Vienna, where he gave private lessons in singing and conducting. He died on August 14, 2022.

Famous compositions 
"Taste and See", 1983
"Touch Somebody's Life", 1983
"I Will Be With You", 1983
"An Irish Blessing" ("May the road rise to meet you"), 1987
"Do You Know Me?", 1987, for Gustav Schörghofer
"Let us go to the house of our Lord", 1992
"Sing to the glory of God", 2001
"Come to the feast", 2002
"Be still", 2002
"Litany of thanksgiving", 2002
"Spirit of God", 2002
"I am special", 2002
"Love endures", 2002
"Welcome in", 2002
"Alive!", 2002
"Praise ye the Lord", 2002

References

External links
 Official website (archived)

1951 births
2022 deaths
21st-century American conductors (music)
21st-century American male musicians
African-American Catholics
African-American classical composers
American classical composers
African-American conductors (music)
African-American male classical composers
American choral conductors
American male conductors (music)
American male classical composers
Austrian people of American descent
Catholics from Virginia
Classical musicians from Virginia
Composers of Christian music
People from Mecklenburg County, Virginia
21st-century African-American musicians
20th-century African-American people